South Croydon is a ward in the London Borough of Croydon, London in the United Kingdom, covering part of the Croham Hurst and South Croydon.

The ward returns three councillors every four years to Croydon Council. The ward held its first election in 2018. The ward has largely replaced the former Croham Ward. At the 2018 election, Maria Gatland, Michael Neal and Jason Perry were elected for South Croydon Ward, as Conservative Party candidates, becoming the first councillors for the ward. According to the Croydon Observatory, run by the Council, the 2016 population was 18,100

The ward is in Croydon South constituency held by Chris Philp MP, one of the safest Conservative seats in London. South Croydon and its predecessor wards of Croham and Sanderstead North have only ever elected Conservative candidates since the creation of the borough in 1965.

List of Councillors

Mayoral election results 
Below are the results for the candidate which received the highest share of the popular vote in the ward at each mayoral election.

Election Results

References

External links
Conservative Councillors for Croydon.
 London Borough of Croydon map of wards.

Wards of the London Borough of Croydon